Marvel's Avengers: Age of Ultron (Original Motion Picture Soundtrack) is the film score for the Marvel Studios film, Avengers: Age of Ultron by Brian Tyler and Danny Elfman. Hollywood Records released the album digitally on April 28, 2015, and in physical formats on May 19, 2015.

Background 
In March 2014, Brian Tyler signed on to compose the film's score, replacing the composer for the first film, Alan Silvestri, while also marking his third film collaboration with Marvel, following Iron Man 3 and Thor: The Dark World in 2013. Tyler stated that the score pays homage to John Williams' scores for Star Wars, Superman, and Raiders of the Lost Ark, and references the scores for the Iron Man, Thor, and Captain America films in order to create a cohesive musical universe, saying, "That's the goal for sure. You have to build in nostalgia and do it upfront so you can relate to it." Danny Elfman also contributed music to the score, using Silvestri's Avengers theme from the first film to create a new hybrid theme. "The movie is such a large canvas that there were parts that really benefited from his kind of voice," Tyler said of Elfman's contributions. "But also, it needed to all fit together and hang together seamlessly, and that was something we worked really hard on doing."

The score was performed by the Philharmonia Orchestra and recorded at Abbey Road Studios in early 2015. In April 2015, Marvel released the track listing and announced that the soundtrack would be released in physical media on May 19, 2015, and digitally on April 28, 2015. The following day, a bonus track composed by Elfman, titled "New Avengers-Avengers: Age of Ultron", was revealed.

Track listing

Additional music
Additional music credited in Avengers: Age of Ultron:

References 

2015 soundtrack albums
2010s film soundtrack albums
Avengers (film series)
Danny Elfman soundtracks
Marvel Cinematic Universe: Phase Two soundtracks
Brian Tyler soundtracks